The Jump returned for a third series on 31 January 2016. It is once again hosted by Davina McCall live from Austria and it was broadcast weekly instead of its usual nightly format. This was reported to be the last in the series of The Jump due to low ratings, however Channel 4 later denied these rumours as being "categorically untrue".

Contestants
The twelve celebrities taking part were revealed on 16 January 2016. On 4 February, Tina Hobley was forced to withdraw from the competition after dislocating her elbow while training for the ski jump. She was replaced by Tom Parker. On 7 February, Rebecca Adlington was forced to withdraw from the competition and was replaced by series 2 contestant Heather Mills. Also on 7 February, Beth Tweddle withdrew from the series after injuring her back after colliding with a barrier. On 9 February, Mark-Francis Vandelli withdrew from the show after fracturing his ankle during training. They were replaced by Joe Swash and Ben Cohen. On 11 February,  Linford Christie withdrew from the competition due to a hamstring injury and was replaced by previously eliminated competitor James Argent. On 13 February, Zara Holland left the series after producers said she was unable to cope with the competition.

Live shows
The series began on 31 January 2016 and will air weekly until 6 March 2016.

Results summary
Colour key

Episode details

Week 1 (31 January)
 Event: Skeleton
 Location: Igls Sliding Centre

Live air jump details

Week 2  (7 February)
 Event: Snow cross
 Location: Kühtai Saddle

Live air jump details

Week 3 (14 February)
 Event: Parallel slalom
 Location: Kühtai Saddle

Live air jump details

Week 4 (21 February)
 Event: Moguls
 Location: Kühtai Saddle

Live air/ski jump details

Week 5: Semi-final (28 February)
 Event: Ski cross
 Location: Kühtai Saddle

Live air/ski jump details

Week 6: Final (6 March)
 Event Snow cross
 Location: Kühtai Saddle

Live ski jump details (Round 1)

Event: Ski cross

Live ski jump details (Round 2)

Ratings
Official ratings are taken from BARB, and include C4+1

Criticism
Several viewers have demanded that the show be cancelled following the reported injuries of three castmembers in just the first two weeks of filming. Tina Hobley suffered a dislocated elbow on 4 February. She was released, but has left the competition. On 7 February, it was announced that Rebecca Adlington would leave the show following a dislocated shoulder and Beth Tweddle would also leave the show following a broken neck. Similarly, Tom Parker tore ligaments in his hand.

References

2016 British television seasons
2016 in Austrian sport